Trigoniulus is a genus of millipede in the family Trigoniulidae. There are at least 90 described species in Trigoniulus.

Species
These 90 species belong to the genus Trigoniulus:

 Trigoniulus abbreviatus Silvestri, 1895
 Trigoniulus ambonensis Attems, 1898
 Trigoniulus amnestus Chamberlin, 1945
 Trigoniulus andropygus Attems, 1917
 Trigoniulus badius Attems, 1897
 Trigoniulus barbouri Chamberlin, 1920
 Trigoniulus bitaeniatus Carl, 1912
 Trigoniulus blainvillii (Le Guillou, 1841)
 Trigoniulus brachycerus Silvestri, 1899
 Trigoniulus brachyurus Attems, 1897
 Trigoniulus burnetticus Attems, 1898
 Trigoniulus caeruleocinctus Chamberlin, 1920
 Trigoniulus caerulocinctus Chamberlin, 1920
 Trigoniulus castaneus Attems, 1915
 Trigoniulus caudatus Attems, 1932
 Trigoniulus charactopygus Attems, 1930
 Trigoniulus comma Attems, 1898
 Trigoniulus concolor Silvestri, 1895
 Trigoniulus corallinus (Gervais, 1847) (rusty millipede)
 Trigoniulus corallipes Pocock, 1896
 Trigoniulus demissus Silvestri, 1899
 Trigoniulus densestriatis Attems, 1897
 Trigoniulus densestriatus Attems, 1897
 Trigoniulus digitulus (Brölemann, 1913)
 Trigoniulus docens Wang
 Trigoniulus erythropisthus Attems, 1898
 Trigoniulus erythropus (Tömösváry, 1885)
 Trigoniulus eurhabdotus Chamberlin, 1920
 Trigoniulus flavipes Attems, 1897
 Trigoniulus formosus Silvestri, 1895
 Trigoniulus frater Chamberlin, 1918
 Trigoniulus garmani Chamberlin, 1918
 Trigoniulus goesi (Porat, 1876)
 Trigoniulus gracilis Silvestri, 1899
 Trigoniulus harpagus Attems, 1917
 Trigoniulus hebes Verhoeff, 1928
 Trigoniulus hemityphlus Verhoeff, 1924
 Trigoniulus heteropus Silvestri, 1899
 Trigoniulus incommodus Carl, 1912
 Trigoniulus insculptus Verhoeff, 1924
 Trigoniulus karykinus Attems, 1897
 Trigoniulus klossi Hirst, 1914
 Trigoniulus laminifer Wang, 1951
 Trigoniulus lawrencei Verhoeff, 1939
 Trigoniulus lissonotus Attems, 1927
 Trigoniulus lumbricinus (Gerstäcker, 1873)
 Trigoniulus macropygus Silvestri, 1897
 Trigoniulus major Chamberlin, 1921
 Trigoniulus melanotelus Chamberlin, 1921
 Trigoniulus montium Verhoeff, 1928
 Trigoniulus niger Takakuwa, 1940
 Trigoniulus obscurus Silvestri, 1899
 Trigoniulus orinomus Attems, 1897
 Trigoniulus ornatus Silvestri, 1895
 Trigoniulus orphinus Attems, 1897
 Trigoniulus oyhinu Attems
 Trigoniulus palaoensis Takakuwa, 1940
 Trigoniulus papuasiae Silvestri, 1895
 Trigoniulus parvulus Attems, 1897
 Trigoniulus philippinus Chamberlin, 1921
 Trigoniulus phranus (Karsch, 1881)
 Trigoniulus placidus Attems, 1930
 Trigoniulus pleuralis Carl, 1912
 Trigoniulus proximus Silvestri, 1895
 Trigoniulus pulcherrimus Pocock, 1898
 Trigoniulus ralumensis Attems, 1914
 Trigoniulus remotus Chamberlin, 1918
 Trigoniulus reonus Pocock, 1895
 Trigoniulus riseri Chamberlin
 Trigoniulus rubrocinctus Chamberlin, 1920
 Trigoniulus ruspolii Silvestri, 1896
 Trigoniulus sanguinemaculatus Silvestri, 1897
 Trigoniulus scaphurus Pocock, 1906
 Trigoniulus segmentatus Takakuwa, 1940
 Trigoniulus sericatus Carl, 1912
 Trigoniulus soleatus Attems, 1897
 Trigoniulus squamifer Attems, 1931
 Trigoniulus squamosus Carl, 1912
 Trigoniulus straeleni Attems, 1932
 Trigoniulus tachypus Pocock, 1894
 Trigoniulus tahitianus Chamberlin, 1920
 Trigoniulus takahasii Takakuwa, 1940
 Trigoniulus targionii Silvestri, 1897
 Trigoniulus ternatensis Chamberlin, 1920
 Trigoniulus tertius Takakuwa, 1940
 Trigoniulus toriii Takakuwa, 1940
 Trigoniulus utagalus Chamberlin, 1947
 Trigoniulus variabilis Attems, 1953
 Trigoniulus venatorius Silvestri, 1899
 Trigoniulus veteranus Attems, 1932

References

Further reading

External links

 

Spirobolida
Millipedes of North America